The Boston Chamber Music Society (BCMS) is an American organization of musicians located in Boston, Massachusetts and dedicated to the performance and promotion of chamber music. The organization performs works from the Baroque era to the present day and is a member of Chamber Music America and ArtsBoston. BCMS' website states that it is "New England’s preeminent chamber music society and presents the most extensive and longest-running concert series in the region". BCMS currently offers 8 concerts throughout the year at Harvard University's Sanders Theatre, New England Conservatory of Music's Jordan Hall and First Church in Cambridge, Congregational. Each spring BCMS also hosts an annual chamber music workshop for mixed ensembles at the Massachusetts Institute of Technology. The organization is led by artistic director Marcus Thompson and managing director Wen Huang.

History 
BCMS was founded in 1982 by a group of music professionals in the Boston area.  Originally called the Boston Conservatory Chamber Players, its founding members include such distinguished musicians as cellist and founding artistic director  Ronald Thomas, cellist and founding executive director Bruce Coppock, violinists Stephanie Chase and Lynn Chang, violist Katherine Murdock, flutist Fenwick Smith, clarinetist Thomas Hill, and pianist Christopher O'Riley, among others. Current members of BCMS include: violist and artistic director Marcus Thompson, oboist Peggy Pearson, clarinetist Romie de Guise-Langlois, violinist Jennifer Frautschi, violinist/violist Yura Lee, violist Dimitri Murrath, cellist Raman Ramakrishnan, double bassist Thomas Van Dyck, and pianist Max Levinson.

BCMS also invites guest musicians to perform in their concerts. Past and current BCMS guests include violinists Steven Copes, Jonathan Crow, Arturo Delmoni, and Ayano Ninomiya; violists Cynthia Phelps, Steven Ansell, Mark Holloway and Nokuthula Ngwenyama; cellists Astrid Schween, Michael Reynolds, Michelle Djokic, Rhonda Rider and Wilhelmina Smith; double bassist Edwin Barker; sopranos Dawn Upshaw and Amanda Forsythe; baritone Chris Pedro Trakas; clarinetists Alexander Fiterstein and Jo-Ann Sternberg; French horn player William Purvis; harpist Jessica Li Zhou; and pianists Rieko Aizawa, Pedja Muzijevic and Benjamin Hochman; among many others.

BCMS has toured Europe, Asia and throughout the United States. The ensemble has also performed at many of the world's leading music festivals and collaborated with some of the world's finest music organizations including The Chamber Music Society of Lincoln Center, the Muir Quartet, the Borromeo Quartet, the Pro Arte Chamber Orchestra, the Sanibel Music Festival, and the Tanglewood Music Festival.

Awards and honors
 Boston Mayor Thomas M. Menino named March 26 as "BCMS Day" as a tribute to the organization's 25th anniversary.

Recordings 
To date BCMS has released six CDs. BCMS has also recorded music for compilation CDs on the Koch Int'l Classics label, Andante label, Music Little People label, Boston Centre label, and Pearl label. The first four of BCMS's CDs listed below were recorded under the Northeastern label, and the fifth and the sixth were under its own recording label. 
 Brahms: Clarinet Trio in A minor, Op. 114 / Clarinet Quintet in B minor, Op. 115, recorded in 1990
 Brahms: Piano Trio in B major, Op. 8 / Piano Quartet in C minor, Op. 60, recorded in 1990
 Shostakovich: Piano Trio in E minor, Op. 67 / Cello Sonata in D minor, recorded in 1994  
 Schoenberg: Verklärte Nacht, Op. 4 / Tchaikovsky: Souvenir de Florence, Op. 70, recorded in 1994  
 Mendelssohn: Octet in E-flat major, Op. 20 / Enescu: Octet in C major, Op. 7, recorded in 1998 
 Mozart: Trio in E-flat major, K. 498 "Kegelstatt" / Schumann: Märchenerzählungen, Op. 132 / Stravinsky: L'Histoire du Soldat, Bartók: Contrasts, recorded in 1999

References

External links
 The Boston Chamber Music Society official site
 Boston Globe 2010 review
 Boston Globe 2010 interview
 Boston Globe 2009 interview

1982 establishments in Massachusetts
Chamber music groups
Musical groups established in 1982